The 2013–14 season was the 99th season of the Isthmian League, which is an English football competition featuring semi-professional and amateur clubs from London, East and South East England. The season saw all three divisions increase from 22 to 24 clubs. The regular season started on 10 August 2013 and finished on 26 April 2014 with the play-off semi-finals scheduled for the week beginning 28 April 2014 and the three finals scheduled for 3–5 May 2014. The fixture list was released during the week beginning 15 July 2013.

Following the resignation of Vauxhall Motors from the Conference North, and the liquidation of Southern League Premier Division club Hinckley United, Redhill and Wroxham were reprieved at the end of the season. Wingate & Finchley were also reprieved from relegation when Worksop Town resigned from the Northern Premier League in late May 2014.

Premier Division

The Premier Division consisted of 18 clubs from the previous season and six new clubs in a division expanded from 22 to 24 clubs:
AFC Hornchurch, relegated from the Conference South
Billericay Town, relegated from the Conference South
Dulwich Hamlet, promoted as champions of Division One South
Grays Athletic, promoted as champions of Division One North
Maidstone United, promoted as play-off winners in Division One South
Thamesmead Town, promoted as play-off winners in Division One North
Thurrock originally finished above the relegation places in 2012–13, and Carshalton Athletic were relegated. However, Thurrock were subsequently deducted three points for fielding an ineligible player, and were thus relegated to Division One North, with Carshalton staying in the Premier Division. A knock-on effect was that Sittingbourne, who had provisionally been switched to Division One North, stayed in Division One South. Thurrock appealed, but the appeal was rejected.

Wealdstone won the division and were promoted to the Conference South, while Lowestoft Town won the play-offs after three consecutive play-off final defeats and were promoted to the Conference North. The Premier Division switched back to four relegation places this season, though Wingate & Finchley were eventually reprieved after Worksop Town resigned from the Northern Premier League.

League table

Top scorers

Play-offs

Semi-finals

Final

Results grid

Stadia and locations

Division One North

Division One North consisted of 18 clubs from the previous season and six new clubs in a division expanded from 22 to 24 clubs:
Barkingside, promoted as runners-up in the Essex Senior League
Burnham Ramblers, promoted as champions of the Essex Senior League
Dereham Town, promoted as champions of the Eastern Counties League
Erith & Belvedere, promoted as champions of the Kent League
Thurrock, relegated from the Premier Division
VCD Athletic, promoted as runners-up in the Kent League

VCD Athletic won the division to earn a second consecutive title and were promoted to the Premier Division along with play-off winners Witham Town. After the league expansion, the Division One sections switched to three relegation places, although Wroxham were reprieved from relegation after the resignation of Vauxhall Motors and the liquidation of Hinckley United higher up the pyramid.

League table

Top scorers

Play-offs

Semi-finals

Final

Results grid

Stadia and locations

Division One South

Division One South consisted of 20 clubs from the previous season and four new clubs in a division expanded from 22 to 24 clubs:
Guernsey, promoted as runners-up in the Combined Counties League
Hastings United, relegated from the Premier Division
Peacehaven & Telscombe, promoted as champions of the Sussex County League
Redhill, promoted as runners-up in the Sussex County League

Peacehaven & Telscombe won the division to earn a second consecutive title and were promoted to the Premier Division along with play-off winners Leatherhead. After the league expansion, the Division One sections switched to three relegation places, although Redhill were reprieved from relegation after the resignation of Vauxhall Motors and the liquidation of Hinckley United higher up the pyramid.

League table

Top scorers

Play-offs

Semi-finals

Final

Results grid

Stadia and locations

League Cup

The Isthmian League Cup 2013–14 (billed as the Robert Dyas Cup 2013–14 for sponsorship reasons) was the 40th season of the Isthmian League Cup, the cup competition of the whole Isthmian League.

Calendar

Sixty-six clubs took part in the competition, while six clubs refused to participate:
Bognor Regis Town
Canvey Island
Dereham Town
Guernsey
VCD Athletic
Wroxham

Preliminary round
Four clubs participated in the Premilinary round, while all other clubs received a bye to the first round.

First round
The two clubs to have made it through the preliminary round were entered into the draw with every other Isthmian League club, making sixty-four teams.

Second round

Third round

Quarterfinals

Semi-finals

Final

See also
Isthmian League
2013–14 Northern Premier League
2013–14 Southern Football League

References

External links
Official website

Isthmian League seasons
7